Ó hAonghusa is the surname of at least two distinct Gaelic-Irish families. It is now anglicised as Hennessy and Hennessey.

One Ó hAonghusa family were located at Cill Bheagáin, in the Kingdom of Uí Failghe, in the Irish midlands.

Another family surnamed Ó hAonghusa were found at Ros Ailithir, in the Kingdom of Desmond. It is from this family that the founder of Hennessy brandy, Richard Hennessy of Killavulen, by Mallow, and Cognac (1720–1800), descended. Richard's descendants, Maurice Hennessy and his cousin Kilian Hennessy (1907–2010), were business magnates and patriarchs of the Hennessy cognac company.

See also
Hennessey (surname)
Hennessy (surname)
Baron Windleshame

References

Irish-language surnames
Surnames of Irish origin
Irish families
Families of Irish ancestry